Tejal Rao is a restaurant critic, recipe developer and writer based in Los Angeles. In 2018, she was named the first California restaurant critic for The New York Times.

Early life and education 
Rao was born in London, but spent time in Kuwait, Sudan, and France during her youth before settling in Cobb County, Georgia as a teenager. Rao attended Emerson College, where she earned a BA in literature. Rao's mother was born in Uganda and her father was raised in India.

Career 
In 2012, Rao joined The Village Voice as a food critic. In 2013, Rao won the James Beard Foundation’s Craig Claiborne Distinguished Restaurant Review Award for her work for The Village Voice.

In 2014, Rao joined Bloomberg as a food editor and restaurant critic. In 2016, she won the James Beard Foundation’s Craig Claiborne Distinguished Restaurant Review Award once again, this time for her work at Bloomberg. In the same year, Rao joined the New York Times as a food department staff writer and monthly columnist for its magazine. In 2018, she was named the New York Times''' first California restaurant critic, to better serve the growing number of New York Times readers in the state. In 2021, Rao was named the New York Times writer for the vegetarian recipe newsletter The Veggie. 

Rao has also contributed to a range of other publications, such as The Atlantic, Edible, and Gourmet,'' among others.

Awards and accolades 

 2012 – Forbes 30 under 30, Food & Wine
2013 – James Beard Foundation Awards, Craig Claiborne Distinguished Restaurant Review Award for "Bangkok Pop, No F etishes,; The Sweet Taste of Success,; Enter the Comfort Zone at 606 R&D"
2016 – James Beard Foundation Awards, Craig Claiborne Distinguished Restaurant Review Award for "A Health Food Restaurant So Cool It Will Have You Happily Eating Seeds"; "Revisiting Momofuku Ko, After the Revolution"; "Polo Bar Review: Ralph Lauren Corrals the Fashionable Herd"
2019 – Vilcek Prize for Creative Promise in Culinary Arts

References

External links 
 

American restaurant critics
Year of birth missing (living people)
Living people
American women critics
Women food writers
American women journalists
Journalists from London
American women writers of Indian descent
British people of Indian descent
British emigrants to the United States
Emerson College alumni
21st-century American journalists
21st-century American women writers
The Village Voice people
Bloomberg L.P. people